Den Fagraste Rosa / Loveliest Rose (released 2001 / 2002 on the Heilo catalog at the Grappa label - HCD 7168) is the first Christmas album from Norwegian folk band Bukkene Bruse.

Reception 

AllMusic awarded the album 4 stars and in its review, Chris Nickson said, "This is a different Christmas album, with songs that are not sung as much around the Christmas tree. There are also old fiddle tunes that are related to Christmas."

Track listing
«Eit barn er født i Betlehem» (3:18)
«Lullámus» (3:15)
«Haugebonden» (5:14)
«Juleftan» (3:38)
«Mit hjerte altid vanker» (6:32)
«St. Sunniva» (3:44)
«Et lidet barn saa lystelig / I denne søde juletid» (7:20)
«Så spela far juleftan» (3:02)
«Den fagraste rosa er funni» (2:35)
«Romjulsgangar» (3:22)
«For saadan' mildheds gaver» (2:53)

Personnel 
Arve Moen Bergset - vocals, violin & Hardingfele
Annbjørg Lien - Hardingfele & nyckelharpa
Steinar Ofsdal - flute
Bjørn Ole Rasch - pipe organ

References 

Christmas albums by Norwegian artists
2001 Christmas albums
Folk Christmas albums
Bukkene Bruse albums